Ballyroe ( is a townland in eastern Knock parish, County Mayo.

Census

Geography
Ballyroe borders Lispatrick to the North. Killoveeny to the South. Caldragh to the north West. It connects with Cloonturnaun slightly to the west on Lough Turnaun. The R323 Regional Road runs through the townland. Eastpoint, which is at the east of the county, is the most easterly point in Knock parish.

Most of Ballyroe is mainly pastureland and quite hilly. There is a lake in the area which has a number of small streams that flow through the area.

Townland marker
Many townlands in Ireland have a marker noting the townland's name. Ballyroe's townland marker is located on the R323 regional road just outside Knock.

See also
 Knock
 Townlands
 County Mayo

References

Townlands of County Mayo